Russ Irwin is an American singer-songwriter, producer, composer and multi-instrumentalist from New York City. He has worked with multiple artists including Aerosmith, Sting, Bryan Adams, Meat Loaf, Foreigner, Cheap Trick, Joe Bonamassa, and Curt Smith.

Irwin studied music business and classical piano at New York University and also attended the New School for jazz piano.  In 1991, he was signed by Charles Koppelman to SBK Records and a self-titled album, produced by Phil Ramone followed later that year. The album debuted on the Billboard Heatseekers chart, and the single, "My Heart Belongs to You" hit No. 28 on the Billboard Hot 100. and the song "I Need You Now" hit No. 36 on the Radio & Records Rock chart. In 1992, Irwin toured with his band, opening for Roxette.

In the mid-1990s, Irwin went on to play with Mayfield, a band featuring Curt Smith, the lead singer of Tears for Fears which led to a touring position as a keyboardist, vocalist and guitarist with Aerosmith (1997–2014), Sting, (2000–2001), Bryan Adams (2002), Cheap Trick (2012) and Joe Bonamassa (2016) He has performed live with Jeff Beck, John Fogerty, Jonny Lang, Slash, Duncan Sheik, and Jessica Simpson. In 2008, Irwin performed on the Chris Botti Live in Boston DVD.

Irwin has written songs for Aerosmith, Foreigner, Scorpions, and Meat Loaf's Bat Out of Hell 3. In 2006, Irwin produced Clay Aiken's single "I Want to Know What Love Is".
In 2012 Irwin co-wrote the Aerosmith Adult top 40 hit "What Could Have Been Love" (#21), on the album Music From Another Dimension and the top 10 hit 'Lollipop' for Japanese artist Lisa Hirako. He then released his second solo album Get Me Home, which included guest artists Steven Tyler and Brad Whitford of Aerosmith, Chris Botti and Dean DeLeo of Stone Temple Pilots.

Discography
Russ Irwin, 1991
Get Me Home 2012

Dimension form Another Dimension - Aerosmith

A little South of Sanity - Aerosmtih

The Best of Foreigner - Foreigner

A Thousand Different Ways - Clay Aiken

Live to Win - Paul Stanley

References

External links

Musicians from New York (state)
Year of birth missing (living people)
Living people
Aerosmith members
20th-century American keyboardists